Sonalika Joshi (born 5 June 1976)  is an Indian television actress. She is better known for her character of Madhavi Bhide in India's longest running sitcom television series Taarak Mehta Ka Ooltah Chashmah.

Personal life
Joshi has completed B.A. with History, Fashion Designing & Theatre. She is married to Sameer Joshi and has one daughter, Arya Joshi.

Career

Joshi has acted in theatre plays like baiko asun shejari, wadhta wadhta wadhe, bol bachchan, choukon etc early in her life. Later on she did Marathi TV serials like paus yeta yeta,kimayagar, mahashweta, nayak, ek shwasache antar, jagnavegali etc and TV commercials as a successful actress. Since 2008, she is playing Madhavi Bhide in Taarak Mehta Ka Ooltah Chashmah opposite Mandar Chandwadkar.

Filmography

Films

Television

References

External links

Actresses from Mumbai
Living people
Indian television actresses
Indian stage actresses
1969 births
21st-century Indian actresses
Actresses in Hindi television